Zvezdan Jovanović (born 19 July 1965), also known as "Zmija" ("Snake") is a Serbian former paramilitary and Commander in the Serbian police's Special Operations Unit, sentenced to 40 years in prison for the assassination of Serbian Prime Minister Zoran Đinđić in 2003.

Early life 
Jovanović was born in the village of Breznica in Kosovo, in 1965. He had been a locksmith until joining the Serbian Volunteer Guard led by Željko Ražnatović in 1991. Jovanović had been a member of the feared anti-terrorist unit Red Berets and held the police rank of lieutenant colonel. He also participated in the Yugoslav Wars in the 1990s, particularly in operations in Kosovo. He was awarded the Medal of Bravery after the Yugoslav Wars ended for being a participant in all engagements for the Serbian Forces.

Assassination of Zoran Đinđić 

Jovanović was arrested on the charges of being responsible for the assassination of Serbian Prime Minister Zoran Đinđić in March 2003. He was convicted of the murder and sentenced to 40 years in prison. The evidence connected him to the infamous Zemun Clan of Serbia's organized crime network, and to its alleged leader, Milorad Ulemek.

He was silent during most of his trial but, allegedly, once confessed to the murder of Đinđić and said in a police report that he feels no remorse for killing him. Due to alleged interrogations, beatings and threats against his family, he claims to have been forced to falsely confess.

References 

1965 births
Living people
Kosovo Serbs
Serbian assassins
Serbian gangsters
Zemun Clan
Assassins of heads of government
Serbian people convicted of murder
People convicted of murder by Serbia
Military personnel from Peja
2003 murders in Europe